Walter Carmona (born 21 June 1957 in Sao Paulo) is a Brazilian judoka and Olympic medalist. He placed 5th at the 1980 Summer Olympics in Moscow, and won a bronze medal at the 1984 Summer Olympics in Los Angeles.

References

1957 births
Living people
Olympic judoka of Brazil
Judoka at the 1980 Summer Olympics
Judoka at the 1984 Summer Olympics
Judoka at the 1988 Summer Olympics
Olympic bronze medalists for Brazil
Sportspeople from São Paulo
Olympic medalists in judo
Brazilian male judoka
Medalists at the 1984 Summer Olympics
Pan American Games medalists in judo
Pan American Games bronze medalists for Brazil
Judoka at the 1983 Pan American Games
Medalists at the 1983 Pan American Games
20th-century Brazilian people
21st-century Brazilian people